Paul Franke (1888–1950) was a German figure skater. He competed in the men's singles event at the 1928 Winter Olympics.

References

1888 births
Place of birth missing
1950 deaths
Place of death missing
Olympic figure skaters of Germany
Figure skaters at the 1928 Winter Olympics
German male single skaters